Bedout Island is a small Australian island in the eastern Indian Ocean.  It lies 42 km offshore from Larrey Point and the mouth of the De Grey River, and 96 km north-east of Port Hedland, on the Pilbara coast of north-west Western Australia.

Description
Bedout is a low and undulating, 31 ha sandy cay on limestone bedrock, heavily vegetated with beach spinifex.  It has an arid climate, an annual average rainfall of 300 mm, and experiences occasional tropical cyclones.  There is a navigational beacon in the centre of the island.  There are three listed shipwrecks in the surrounding waters, all of vessels wrecked between 1890 and 1912.  At some time in the past black rats were inadvertently introduced, probably by visiting pearling vessels in the late 19th century, but were eradicated in 1991.

Status
The island is an A-class nature reserve, managed by the Department of Environment and Conservation.  It is part of the Western Australian Coastal Islands (Dixon Island to Cape Keraudren) site which is listed on Australia's Register of the National Estate.  It is also classified by BirdLife International as an Important Bird Area because of its seabird breeding colonies.

Birds
The island supports over 1,000 nesting pairs of brown boobies, making it one of the largest colonies in Western Australia. This species regularly incorporates anthropogenic debris into its nests, presumably mistaking items for nesting materials, including on Bedout Island where around 5% of >700 nests surveyed in 2016 and 2017 contained debris (primarily hard plastic fragments, rope, and fishing line).

Bedout Island is also home to over 1,000 nesting pairs each of common noddies and crested terns, 500–1,000 lesser frigatebirds, 100-500 masked boobies, as well as lesser crested, roseate and sooty terns, silver gulls and white-bellied sea eagles.  Many of these do not breed elsewhere in the Pilbara.  The main breeding season comprises the winter months from May to September.

Notes

References
 
 

Islands of the Pilbara
Nature reserves in Western Australia
Important Bird Areas of Western Australia
Seabird colonies